Davemark Cereno Apolinario (born January 20, 1999) is a Filipino professional boxer. He is the current IBO Flyweight champion.

Professional career
Apolinario made his professional debut on 10 June 2017, defeating fellow Filipino boxer Prince Canonero via first-round technical knockout (TKO).

Following the bout, Apolinario defeated Rio Gulipatan a month after his previous fight, winning via unanimous decision (UD) through four rounds.

A couple of months later, it was reported that Apolinario was scheduled to fight Rudy Salaton on 9 September 2017. Apolinario defeated Salaton via first-round TKO.

Following the bout, Apolinario defeated Rez Padrogane via fifth-round TKO.

A couple of months after his previous fight, Apolinario defeated Frankie Batuon via second-round knock out (KO).

More than a month later, Apolinario defeated Jenuel Lauza, winning a unanimous decision (UD) through eight rounds, all judges scored 80–72 in favor of Apolinario.

More than three months later, Apolinario returned to flyweight and defeated fellow Filipino boxer, Charles Canedo via a round 2 technical knock out (TKO).

WBC ABCO Youth flyweight title 
It was reported that Apolinario was scheduled to fight fellow Filipino boxer, Michael Camelion on 9 September 2018. Apolinario defeated Camelion winning a unanimous decision (UD) through eight rounds. Apolinario won the vacant WBC ABCO Youth flyweight title.

Less than two months after his previous fight, Apolinario defeated fellow Filipino boxer, Joan Imperial via a knock out (KO) in 1:53 of the first round.

More than three months later, Apolinario defeated Filipino compatriot, Romshane Sarguilla winning a unanimous decision (UD) through eight rounds.

On 9 June 2019, Apolinario defeated Filipino compatriot, Adrian Lerasan winning a unanimous decision (UD) through ten rounds.

Four months later, Apolinario defeated Arnold Garde via a first-round TKO.

A couple of months later, Apolinario defeated Richard Rosales via a referee technical decision (RTD) in the fifth round.

On 21 November 2020, after an eleven-month rest due to the COVID-19 pandemic, Apolinario defeated Bonjun Loperez via a referee technical decision (RTD) in the fourth round.

WBA Asia Flyweight title 
On 16 July 2021, less than eight months after his previous fight, Apolinario defeated Charlie Malupangue winning a technical knock out (TKO) in the fourth round. Apolinario won the vacant WBA Asia flyweight title.

On 5 February 2022, Apolinario defeated fellow Filipino boxer Mike Kinaadman via a technical knockout (TKO) in the fifth round.

IBO Flyweight title 
On July 29, 2022, Apolinario won the vacant IBO Flyweight title by defeating Gideon Buthelezi via a knockout (KO) in the first round.

Seven months later, Apolinario was scheduled to face Indonesian boxer Frengky Rohi in a non-title fight. Apolinario defeated Rohi via a referee technical decision (RTD) in the second round.

Professional boxing record

Titles in boxing

Minor world titles
IBO flyweight title (112 lbs)

Regional titles
WBC ABCO Youth flyweight title (112 lbs)
WBA Asia flyweight title (112 lbs)

References

External links

1999 births
Living people
Light-flyweight boxers
Flyweight boxers
Filipino male boxers
Sportspeople from General Santos